​​Jixian Wang (born 3 April 1985) is a Chinese programmer from Ukraine known for video blogging his war experiences during the 2022 Russian invasion of Ukraine.
Wang's accounts counter the Chinese Communist Party's version of events, for which he has been heavily censored and cut off from his family in China.
Wang was temporarily suspended from YouTube over reports of inciting violence because of showing the war related information. After that, Wang Jixian continues to tell the story of Odesa to Sinophone audiences.

See also  
 Great Translation Movement
 China and the 2022 Russian invasion of Ukraine

References 

Living people
Chinese bloggers
Chinese YouTubers
Chinese computer programmers
1985 births
Engineers from Beijing
People of the 2022 Russian invasion of Ukraine